Oroqen Autonomous Banner (Mongolian:    , Orčon-u öbertegen jasaqu qosiɣu, Mongolian Cyrillic: Орчон өөртөө засах хошуу; Simplified Chinese: 鄂伦春自治旗, Pinyin: Èlúnchūn Zìzhìqí) is an autonomous banner that lies directly south of the urban district of Hailar in the prefecture-level city of Hulunbuir. , there were 223,752 inhabitants with a population density of 4.84 inhabitants per km2. Its capital is the town of Alihe. It includes Ganhe (甘河), Dayangshu (大杨树), Jiwen (吉文) but excludes the Jiagedaqi and Songling Districts.

Ethnic groups in Oroqen Autonomous Banner, 2000 census

Climate

References 

Autonomous counties of the People's Republic of China
County-level divisions of Inner Mongolia
Oroqen people
Hulunbuir